Pressure & Time is the second studio album by American rock band Rival Sons. It was released on June 20, 2011, in the UK and was released in the United States on June 28, 2011, through UK independent label Earache Records. The cover artwork was designed by Storm Thorgerson, who had worked for Led Zeppelin and Pink Floyd before. A music video has been released for title track "Pressure & Time", which features the band performing in different backgrounds. The title track was also used as the theme song of the 2013 action-adventure video game Ride to Hell: Retribution, was featured in the movie Swearnet and in the commercial for the 2024 Chevrolet Silverado  (reference needed).  The track Get Mine was featured in a Jeremiah Weed premium malt beverage television advertising campaign showing an arm wrestling competition.

Critical reception

AllMusic editor William Ruhlmann noted how the band was an oddity in Earache's mostly death metal roster but gave praise to their musical ability to harken back to late 1960s hard rock reminiscent of Led Zeppelin ("Pressure & Time", "Gypsy Heart") and "Hush"-era Deep Purple ("All Over the Road"), concluding that "anyone who likes that kind of music should overlook the implications of the record label and check out Rival Sons." Joseph Giannone of Cinema Blend was ambivalent towards the record, commending the band's catchy musicianship for capturing late 1960s and 1970s hard rock, but felt it lacked virtuosity and a style to call their own. He singled out the title track, "Gypsy Heart" and "Face of Light" for showcasing the band's potential in their given subgenre and should be used as a blueprint to follow, saying that "instead of concerning themselves with easily digestible music, then maybe this album would have been distinguished."

Track listing

Personnel
Adapted credits from the liner notes of Pressure & Time.
Rival Sons
 Jay Buchanan – vocals
 Scott Holiday – guitar
 Robin Everhart – bass
 Michael Miley – drums

Additional musicians
 Arlan Shierbaum – Wurlitzer, B3 ("Only One" and "Face of Light")

Production
 Dave Cobb – production
 Pete DiRado – recording, engineering
 Mark Rains – mixing
 Pete Lyman – mastering

Charts

References

2011 albums
Earache Records albums
Rival Sons albums
Albums produced by Dave Cobb